The 2019 CAMS Australian Formula 4 Championship (initially known for sponsorship purposes as the CAMS Jayco Australian Formula 4 Championship and later as the CAMS Payce Australian Formula 4 Championship) was the fifth and final season Australian Formula 4 Championship, a motor racing competition for open-wheel racing cars complying with Formula 4 regulations, which were created by the Fédération Internationale de l'Automobile (FIA) for entry-level open-wheel championships. Teams and drivers competed in eighteen races at four venues, starting on 14 March and ending on 14 July.

Teams and drivers

Calendar
All rounds were held in Australia.  For the first time the series supported the Formula 1 Australian Grand Prix.  The remaining events supported the Shannons Nationals.

Points system
Championship points were awarded in each race as follows:

Championship standings

Notes

References

External links

Australian F4 Championship seasons
Australian
Formula 4
Australian F4